Metin Mert (born Detlef Müller; 21 May 1965) is a German-born naturalised Turkish professional footballer who played as a goalkeeper.

Career
Detlef Müller was born Duisburg, West Germany. His first Oberliga game for Bochum II was on 31 December 1983 in a 3–0 win against Hammer SpVg. He was substituted on in the 75th minute for Markus Croonen. In summer 1985 Müller transferred to Westfalia Herne, where he played until 1988.

During a vacation to Turkey in 1988 Müller was spotted by Erdal Keser playing Beach soccer. He was offered a contract from Sarıyer out of the Turkish First Football League, which he accepted.

Career statistics

Honours 
Kocaelispor
 Turkish Cup: 2002

References

External links
 Profile at TFF.org

1965 births
Living people
Footballers from Duisburg
German footballers
Naturalized citizens of Turkey
Turkish footballers
Süper Lig players
VfL Bochum II players
SC Westfalia Herne players
Sarıyer S.K. footballers
Trabzonspor footballers
Kocaelispor footballers
Konyaspor footballers
Antalyaspor footballers
Association football goalkeepers
VfB Homberg players
Association football goalkeeping coaches